Ambassadors is a three-episode British comedy-drama television serial that ran on BBC Two in 2013. Ambassadors follows the lives of the employees of the British embassy in the fictional Central Asian nation of Tazbekistan.

Cast
Britons
 David Mitchell as Keith Davis, the British Ambassador to Tazbekistan
 Robert Webb as Neil Tilly, the Deputy Head of Mission
 Keeley Hawes as Jennifer, the Ambassador's wife and a physician
 Matthew Macfadyen as the Foreign Office official (known as POD, for "Prince of Darkness")
 Susan Lynch as Caitlin, the Head of Consular Affairs
 Amara Karan as Isabel, the Trade and Political Secretary
 Michael Smiley as Mr. Jackson (also known as "Mister 21"), a Foreign Office interrogation specialist
 Henry Lloyd-Hughes as Simon Broughton, a human rights activist
 Elliot Cowan as Stephen Pembridge, a solo performance actor
 Tom Hollander as Prince Mark, a minor British royal
 Julian Lewis Jones as Mike Treasure, Prince Mark's valet and "security man"

Tazbekis
 Velibor Topic as Svecko, an Interior Ministry official
 Yigal Naor as President Karzak of the Republic of Tazbekistan
 Richard Katz as Jamatt, second-in-charge to Karzak
 Natalia Tena as Tanya, Neil's Tazbek girlfriend and a barmaid
 George Lasha as the tall surveillance man
 Sevan Stephan as the short surveillance man
 Danny Scheinmann as a guide
 Krystian Godlewski as Amil Zarifi, a dissident
 Umit Ulgen as Oybek Yerzhan, Tanya's brother and a rebel
 Lydia Leonard as Fergana Karzak, the daughter of President Karzak

Embassy Tazbekis
 Shivani Ghai as Natalia, the Head of Public Relations
 Debbie Chazen as Ludmilla, the embassy housekeeper
 Andy Lucas as Sergei, the embassy driver
 Jenny Galloway as Mrs. Petrova, the embassy cook

Others
 Oliver Dimsdale as the French Ambassador to Tazbekistan
 Lachele Carl as Petra, the American Ambassador to Tazbekistan

Production

On 23 August 2012, BBC Two's controller Janice Hadlow announced the commissioning of the limited television serial, by herself and Cheryl Taylor, the controller of BBC comedy commissioning. The series went into production in January 2013.

Robert Webb said: "It's sort of Yes, Prime Minister meets Spooks at a bad disco". David Mitchell said: "It's credible, hopefully funny at times, but serious at times. It was very nice to do something in a slightly different genre. It was nice to do a bit of acting alongside all my sitting in a sparkly chair telling a joke."

Part of the series was filmed in Bursa in western Türkiye. According to AZ Celtic Films, Bursa was chosen because of its diversity and closeness to Istanbul, which is called the "hub of the film industry". The series received help from the Turkish military and the local airport, where filming took two days. The Foreign and Commonwealth Office (FCO) allowed the cast to run a read-through in one of its grandest rooms.

James Wood, the co-writer of the series said "The stories we were told by diplomats were very closely reflected in the series. We ended up with 200 pages of research" and that a week was spent in Kazakhstan with the Ambassador there. According to Craig Murray, the former ambassador to Uzbekistan, Big Talk Productions tried to buy the rights to his book, Murder in Samarkand, for a film and believes the series, a "state-sponsored satire", is based on it. In his opinion, the FCO had backed it to "defuse the horror of our alliance with Uzbekistan and make it banal, accepted and safe".

The title sequence for the show was created by Joe Berger and Pascal Wyse. Throughout the series the Union Flag always appears upside-down: in the title sequence, outside the embassy and on the ambassador's Land Rover. When the flag is flown upside down it means that the position flying it is in distress.

Episodes

Reception

Ratings
Overnight figures showed that the first episode attracted 1.21 million viewers on BBC Two. It was watched by 5.4% of television viewers during its original broadcast. The second episode saw an audience share of 4.5%.

Critical reception
According to Alison Graham of the Radio Times: "There are some funny bits, but it's a drama with a light touch, rather than an out-and-out comedy. Not that there's anything wrong with that, as this is an engaging, even winning, hour." The Daily Telegraph journalist Jake Wallis Simons commented that "the two leading actors, Messrs David Mitchell and Robert Webb, brought the thing alive." Mitchell's character, he wrote, "was a wonderfully explosive and strait-laced character, who thought nothing of placing the sale of British military helicopters above rescuing British citizens from death at the hands of the Tazbekistan regime. At the same time, of course, he was 100 per cent buffoon." While considering it inferior to the same lead performers' Peep Show, Ellen E. Jones wrote in The Independent considered "Webb was a particular pleasure to watch. After so long playing a total wally, it was simply fascinating to see him as a competent, practical employee."

The Guardians Sam Wollaston said it was "More of a drama with jokes than jokes strung together with some kind of story. The funniest bits are almost incidental" and "Ambassadors didn't blow me away, but it grew on me as it went along."

See also
Flying the Flag

References

External links
 
 
 

2013 British television series debuts
2013 British television series endings
2010s British comedy-drama television series
2010s British television miniseries
BBC comedy-drama television shows
BBC television miniseries
Central Asia
English-language television shows
Television series by Big Talk Productions
Television series set in fictional countries
Works about diplomats